Oscillation Isolator is the second album by fire Zuave. Released in 2009, fire Zuave continues to feature cover artwork by David Barnes.

Track listing
 "August Air"
 "Down By the Sea"
 "Harmonica"
 "Orchid"
 "Prison Break"
 "Trailor Theme"
 "45 Caliber"
 "Will You Ever Understand I'm Not Afraid of Who I Am"
 "By the Side of a Mountain"

References

2009 albums